The Province of Trieste is a province in the autonomous Friuli-Venezia Giulia region of Italy.  The following is a list of notable Triestini and some outsiders who either wrote about the city or resided there.

Literature
Many famous authors were born and/or lived many years in Trieste. They include:

Italian-language authors
 Enzo Bettiza, writer and journalist, born in Split
 Nicoletta Costa, children's book writer and illustrator
 Claudio Magris, writer and essayist
 Biagio Marin, poet (born in Grado)
 Giorgio Pressburger, author and director
 Umberto Saba, poet
 Francesco Saba Sardi, author, essayist and translator
 Scipio Slataper, essayist
 Giani Stuparich, writer and essayist
 Italo Svevo, novelist
 Susanna Tamaro, novelist
 Fulvio Tomizza, writer, born in Istria (now in Croatia)

Slovene-language authors
 Vladimir Bartol, writer
 Igo Gruden, poet
 Dušan Jelinčič, writer, essayist, and mountain climber
Marica Nadlišek Bartol, writer and editor
 Boris Pahor, novelist
 Alojz Rebula, writer and essayist

German-language authors
 Theodor Däubler, writer and poet
 Robert Hamerling writer
 Ricarda Huch writer
 Julius Kugy, writer and essayist (born in Gorizia)
 Rainer Maria Rilke, wrote Duino Elegies during his stay in Duino

Authors in other languages
 Isabel Burton
 Richard Francis Burton
 James Joyce
 D. H. Lawrence
 Charles Lever
 Jan Morris
 Stendhal, French author and essayist; served as Consul of France in Trieste
 Alexander Wheelock Thayer
 Samuel David Luzzatto, Italian Jewish scholar, poet, and a member of the Wissenschaft des Judentums movement

Architects, inventors, gallerists, designers, and visual artists 
 
 
 Josip Belušić, inventor of the speedometer
 Emilio Ambrosini, architect
 Milko Bambič, illustrator and cartoonist
 Franca Batich, Italian painter
 Leo Castelli, pioneering gallerist and contemporary art dealer
 Avgust Černigoj, Slovene painter
 Bruno Chersicla, painter and sculptor
 Tullio Crali, futurist painter
 Marcello Dudovich, illustrator
 Leonor Fini, artist
 Isidoro Grünhut, artist 
 Franko Luin, Swedish-Slovene graphic designer
 Argio Orell, painter
 Boris Podrecca, architect
 Alessandra Querzola, Oscar nominated set designer
 Stanislav Rapotec, painter
 Ruggero Rovan, painter
 Felice Schiavoni, artist
 Ernesto Nathan Rogers, architect
 Eugenio Scomparini, painter
 Vito Timmel, painter
 Jožef Tominc, Biedermeier painter
 Alexander Kircher, painter
 Antonio Valdoni, painter
 Umberto Veruda, painter
 Carlo Wostry, painter

Actors, models, musicians, and performance artists 
 Federico Agostini, violinist
 Alda Balestra, fashion and beauty model
 Antonio Bibalo, pianist and composer
 Paola Loew, actress
 Hans Herbert Fiedler, opera stage actor
 Piero Cappuccilli, operatic baritone
 Antonio D'Antoni, opera composer and conductor
 Raffaello de Banfield, British composer
 George Dolenz, actor; father of Micky Dolenz of the Monkees
 Paul Henreid, actor
 Alfred Jaëll, Austrian pianist
 Tullio Kezich, actor, playwright, and screenplayer
 Paolo Longo, composer and conductor
 Alessandro Lotta, former bassist of the bands Rhapsody of Fire and Wingdom
 Lelio Luttazzi, musician, composer, showman and presenter 
 Mauro Maur, trumpet player and composer
 Alexander Moissi, Austrian stage actor of Albanian descent
 Ave Ninchi, actress
 Denis Novato, Slovene musician
 Alberto Randegger, composer
 Ivan Rassimov, Italian actor of Serbian descent
 Rada Rassimov, Italian actress of Serbian descent
 Enrico Rava, jazz trumpeter
 Teddy Reno, singer and producer
 Victor de Sabata, conductor
 Laura Solari, film actress
 Alex Staropoli, keyboardist of the band Rhapsody of Fire
 Giorgio Strehler, opera and theater director
 Elisa Toffoli, singer/songwriter, pianist, and guitarist
 Luca Turilli, guitarist of the band Rhapsody of Fire
 Carlo Rizzo, stage and film actor
 Loredana Nusciak, actress and model
 Fulvia Franco, Italian actress, model and beauty pageant titleholder 
 Anita Kravos, Italian actress
 Rodolfo Ranni, Italian Argentine film actor

TV personalities 
 Lidia Bastianich, Italian-American chef and TV cooking show host whose family lived in a refugee camp in Trieste after their escape from Istria, Yugoslavia (now Croatia)
 Bianca Maria Piccinino, journalist RAI, the first woman to read a news broadcasting

Entrepreneurs and business leaders
 Andrea Illy, entrepreneur
 Ernesto Illy, entrepreneur, founder of coffee empire
 Francesco Illy, entrepreneur, inventor of coffee machinery
 Lionello Stock, entrepreneur of liqueurs and beverages, founder of Stock S.p.A. (known for the  Keglevich brand)
 Mihajlo Vučetić, grain merchant, shipowner and shareholder in Austrian Lloyd.

Fashion designers 
 Renato Balestra, fashion designer
 Adriano Goldschmied, leading international denim designer; founder of Diesel and Replay jeans
 Ottavio Missoni, fashion designer
 Mila Schön, fashion designer

Journalists and authors 
 Sergio Amidei, screenwriter
 Giovanna Botteri, journalist
 Almerigo Grilz, journalist, freelance war reporter and politician. Was killed during an African reportage
 Leo Negrelli, journalist
 Ann Shulgin, author
 Demetrio Volcic, journalist and politician

Political figures 
 Engelbert Besednjak, Slovene politician
 Willer Bordon, Italian politician, Minister of the Environment, 2000-2001
 Josip Ferfolja, Slovenian social-democratic politician and human rights activist
 Odilo Globočnik, Nazi war criminal, SS leader
 Riccardo Illy, Italian politician
 Ezio Mizzan, Italian diplomat, the second Italian Ambassador to Thailand (1959–1965) and the ninth Italian Ambassador to Pakistan (1966–1969)
 Stefano Patuanelli, Italian politician, minister of economic development
 Mitja Ribičič, Slovenian Communist leader, Prime Minister of Yugoslavia (1969–1971)
 Vittorio Vidali (aka Enea Sormenti, Jacobo Hurwitz Zender, Carlos Contreras), Communist agent
 Josip Wilfan, Slovene jurist, politician, and human rights activist

Religious figures 
 Pietro Bonomo, humanist and bishop, supporter of the Protestant Reformation
 Moisè Tedeschi, rabbi and Bible commentator

Scholars, scientists, and intellectuals 
 Luisa Accati, historian and feminist theoretician
 Florian Biesik, Silesian linguist, Wymysorys language scholar and poet
 Ludwig Boltzmann, Austrian physicist
 Paolo Budinich, physicist
 Sir Richard Burton, British explorer, geographer, writer, orientalist, cartographer, linguist, poet, fencer, and diplomat; discovered Lake Tanganyika
 Lavo Čermelj, Slovene physicist and public intellectual
 Joseph Straus, property law intellectual
 Giacomo Ciamician, chemist
Laura Dallapiccola, Italian librarian and translator
 Alessandro Ferrara, philosopher and author
 Pietro Kandler, historian, archaeologist and jurist
 Gillo Dorfles, philosopher and historian
 Arturo Falaschi, MD, geneticist
 Boris Furlan, Slovenian legal theorist, translator and politician
 Anton Füster, Austrian revolutionary activist, author and pedagogue
 Guido Goldschmiedt, Austrian chemist
 Boris M. Gombač, Slovenian historian
 Spiridon Gopčević, Serbian astronomer and historian
 Margherita Hack, Italian astronomer
 Albert O. Hirschman, economist and political scientist; obtained his doctorate from the University of Trieste
 Fiorella Kostoris, economist
 Doro Levi, archaeologist
 Salvatore Pincherle, Italian mathematician
 Jože Pirjevec, Slovene historian
 Alessandro Pizzorno, Political Scientist and Sociologist
 Guido Weiss, mathematician
 Abdus Salam, Pakistani theoretical physicist, Nobel prize laureate
 Denis Sciama, British physicist
 Marta Verginella, Slovene historian
 Ivan Vidav, Slovene mathematician
 Edoardo Weiss, Jewish psychoanalyst
 Sigismund Zois, Slovene mecenate and natural scientist

Sportspeople 
 Nino Benvenuti, boxer
 Biaggio Chianese, boxer
 Claudia Coslovich, athlete
 Fabio Cudicini, football player (goalkeeper)
 Aldo Dorigo, football player
 Giorgio Ferrini, football player
 Ambrogio Fogar, sailor, rally driver, and adventurer
 Livio Franceschini, basketball player
 Sandro Gamba, basketball coach and player
 Matteo Gladig, chess master
 Margherita Granbassi, foil fencer
 Duilio Loi, boxer
 Cesare Maldini, former AC Milan captain, Italian football team manager
 Giovanni Martinolich, chess master
 Mauro Milanese, football player
 Mario Milano, professional wrestler
 Tiberio Mitri, boxer
 Uberto De Morpurgo (1896–1961), Austrian-born Italian tennis player
 Giorgio Oberweger, athlete
 Nicola Princivalli, football player
 Giovanni Raicevich, professional wrestler
 Carlo Rigotti, football player
 Nereo Rocco, footballer
 Licio Rossetti, footballer
 Cesare Rubini, water polo player
 Matteo Scozzarella, football player
 Giovanni Steffè, rower
 Caterina Stenta, Windsurf and Standup paddleboarding athlete
 Max Tonetto, footballer
 Fabio Tuiach, boxer
 Ferruccio Valcareggi, football player and coach
 Renzo Vecchiato, basketball player
 Andrea de Adamich, former Formula 1 driver
 Sara Gama, Italian footballer, defender and captain of both Serie A club Juventus and the Italian national team.

Statesmen and aristocracy
 Mathilde Bonaparte, Napoleon's niece, daughter of his brother Jérôme Bonaparte; born in Trieste in 1820
 Joseph Fouché, duke of Otranto, spent his last 5 years exiled in Trieste
 Maximilian of Habsburg, Emperor of Mexico, Archduke of Austria (Schönbrunn 1832 - Querétaro 1867); built the white castle and park on the riviera; planted plants in the park from his travels around the world
 Fiorello La Guardia, 99th Mayor of New York City, son of Trieste-born Irene Coen, of the Luzzatto family. Spent part of his 20s in Trieste with his family, also working for the US Consulate. 
 Princess Marie Adélaïde de France, Madame de France, daughter of King Louis XV of France, died in Trieste in 1800 and was buried at San Giusto Cathedral 
 Princess Marie Louise Thérèse Victoire de France, Madame de France, daughter of King Louis XV of France, died in Trieste in 1799 
 Louis Antoine Debrauz de Saldapenna, Austrian diplomat, journalist and author
 Gottfried von Banfield (1890–1986), top Austrian Empire fighter ace in World War I

References 

Trieste